Stephen F. Austin High School was a senior high school in Port Arthur, Texas and a part of the Port Arthur Independent School District.

In 2002 it merged into Memorial High School.

References

External links
 
 The Eagle, Yearbook of Stephen F. Austin High School, 1969 - at University of North Texas

2002 disestablishments in Texas
Educational institutions disestablished in 2002
Port Arthur, Texas
Public high schools in Texas